Dariusz Zielke (born 21 October 1960) is a Polish former athlete who specialised in the high jump. He won a bronze medal at the Friendship Games which were organised in 1984 for countries that boycotted the 1984 Summer Olympics.

His personal bests in the event are 2.31 metres outdoors (Warsaw 1984) and 2.28 metres indoors (Handen 1986).

His brother, Piotr Zielke, was also a high jumper.

International competitions

References

1960 births
Living people
Polish male high jumpers
Place of birth missing (living people)
Competitors at the 1986 Goodwill Games
Friendship Games medalists in athletics